Sickels is a surname. Notable people with the surname include:

Emma Cornelia Sickels, (1854–1921), American teacher. 
Frederick Ellsworth Sickels (1819–1895), American inventor
Garrett Sickels, American footballer
 John Sickels (b. 1968), American baseball writer
Quentin Sickels, American footballer

See also
Sickles, a surname with alternativee spelling

See also
Sickel
Sickle (disambiguation)